This is a list of notable people associated with Bowling Green State University, located in the American city of Bowling Green, Ohio.

Arts and entertainment

Authors and writers
 Fernando Alegría, Chilean poet
 Tony Ardizzone, novelist
 James Baldwin, author, poet (writer in residence)
 Matt Bell, Author
 Mary Biddinger, poet
 Philana Marie Boles, author of Glitz, Little Divas, In the Paint, and Blame It on Eve
 James Carlos Blake, author
 Scott Cairns, poet
 Gary Cohn, Comic book writer
 Jennifer Crusie, writer
 Jim Daniels, poet and writer
 Tom De Haven, writer
 Anthony Doerr, Pulitzer Prize-winning writer
 Frank Dungan, television producer and writer
 Edmundo Farolan, author and actor
 David Feldman, author of Imponderables
 Robert Ferrigno, writer
 Carolyn Forche, writer
 Charles Fort, poet
 Sally Miller Gearhart, Science fiction writer, women's studies pioneer, and early gay rights activist.
 Diana Pavlac Glyer, Author and expert on J. R. R. Tolkien, C. S. Lewis, and the Inklings.
 Darrell Hamamoto, writer
 Joseph D. Haske, author
 Alan Heathcock, fiction writer
 Steve Heller, fiction author
 Brad Hurtado, Television producer

 Jack LoGiudice, Television writer and producer
 Sandra Markle, Children's book author* Susan Neville, short story writer
 Charles Nicol, Writer, expert on Vladimir Nabokov
 Ty Pak, Korean American author
 William Patrick Patterson, author and fourth way teacher
 Barbara Paul, author
 James Purdy, author
 Arnold Rampersad, Pulitzer Prize-nominated author
 Terry Ryan, writer
 Marc Sumerak, Freelance writer, often works on Marvel Comics series.
 Jean Thompson, fiction writer
 Anne Valente, author
 Allen Wier, author
 Dara Wier, poet
 Kayla Williams, linguist and author
 Theresa Williams, writer

Actors
 Lexi Allen, singer, actress, television personality 
 Bernie Casey, former professional football player, actor, and visual artist
 Tim Conway, Emmy Award-winning actor
 Robert Patrick, actor
 James Pickens, Jr., actor
 Eva Marie Saint, Academy Award-winning actress
 Quinton Flynn, voice actor
 Ron Sweed, television actor
 Frank Dungan, television producer and Primetime Emmy Award winner
 Kathia Rodriguez, actress
 Matt Zimmerman, actor
 Ric Reitz, actor

Musicians and composers
 Ray Davis, Bass singer and founding member of The Parliaments
 Bob Hartman, Christian rock artist and founder of the band Petra
 Jennifer Higdon, Grammy Award and Pulitzer Prize-winning classical music composer
 Ric Ocasek, rhythm guitarist and songwriter for The Cars 
 James Swearingen concert band literature composer
 John Douglas, conductor
 Chris Castle, folk musician
 Hildward Croes, Aruban musician
 Tim Hagans, jazz musician
 Marian McPartland, jazz musician
 Uzee Brown Jr, composer
 David Conte, composer
 Joseph Dangerfield, composer
 Minnita Daniel-Cox, Soprano
 Rich Perry, jazz musician
 William Takacs, musician
 Mildred Miller, Mezzo-soprano, received an honorary degree
 Bill Randle, DJ, received an honorary doctorate
 Eglė Janulevičiūtė, Lithuanian classical pianist
 Michael Holmes, saxophonist

Artists
 Jason Nelson, pioneering net artist, digital poet
 Barbara Bosworth, large format photographer
 Tim McCreight, metal smith
 Douglas Steakley, metal smith and photographer. Winner of the 2003 Ansel Adams Award for Conservation Photography.
 William Silvers, Wildlife artist, painter for Walt Disney, Industrial Light and Magic, Sony Pictures, DreamWorks, and Warner Brothers.
 Robert Archambeau, ceramic artist. Worked in the studio of Jun Kaneko. Colleague of painter Don Reichert
 Tony Kern, film director, directed A Month of Hungry Ghosts
 Rick Valicenti, graphic designer
 Kathrine Baumann, handbag designer, model, and actress
 Ed Sayles, Theater director
 Dominick Labino, glass artist, scientist, honorary doctorate
 George O. Hughes, painter, poet, performance artist

Dancers
 Mary Jo Freshley, Korean dance instructor at University of Hawaiʻi at Mānoa
 Judson Laipply, creator of the "Evolution of Dance"

Athletes

Olympians
 Rob Blake, Hall of Fame ice hockey player, won Stanley Cup in 2001; three-time member of the Canadian Olympic hockey team, winning a gold medal in 2002
 Scott Hamilton, professional figure skater and Olympic gold medalist
 Ken Morrow, former professional ice hockey player and member of the 1980 USA Olympic Hockey team
 Mark Wells, former professional ice hockey player and member of the 1980 USA Olympic Hockey team
 Dave Wottle, Won an Olympic gold medal for the 800 meter run at the 1972 Summer Olympics
 Margarita Kalmikova, two time Olympian swimmer from Latvia

Soccer
 Omari Aldridge, professional soccer player formerly with Beijing Hongdeng
 Dennis Mepham, former professional soccer player for the Cleveland Force (1978–1988)
 Dana Veth, former professional soccer player
Bud Lewis, former professional soccer player and head coach at Wilmington College between 1975 and 2017

Basketball
 Harold Anderson, former college basketball coach; Basketball Hall of Fame member
 Antonio Daniels, professional basketball player currently with the Texas Legends
 Richaun Holmes, professional basketball player for the Sacramento Kings
 Keith McLeod, professional basketball player currently with BC Kalev/Cramo 
 Jay Larranaga, professional basketball player, member of Ireland basketball team
 Howard Komives, former professional basketball player, New York Knicks, Detroit Pistons, Buffalo Braves, Kansas City Kings
 Isaac Rosefelt (born 1985), American-Israeli basketball player for Hapoel Jerusalem in the Israeli Basketball Premier League
 Nate Thurmond, former professional basketball player; seven-time NBA All-Star; member of the Naismith Memorial Basketball Hall of Fame; named one of the 50 Greatest Players in NBA History
 Bob Hill, professional basketball coach
 Tom Collen, collegiate basketball coach
 Tom Hancock, basketball coach
 Steve Merfeld, basketball coach
 Charlie Parker, basketball coach
 Richard Skeel, basketball coach

Baseball
 Larry Arndt, infielder for the Oakland Athletics; BGSU Baseball Hall of Fame member
 Burke Badenhop, former MLB pitcher
 Doug Bair, former professional baseball player
 Jim Joyce, former MLB umpire
 Nolan Reimold, former MLB baseball player 
 Andy Tracy, former professional baseball player; current manager for the Williamsport Crosscutters of the New York–Penn League
 Orel Hershiser, former professional baseball player, currently an analyst for the Los Angeles Dodgers,
 Roger McDowell, former professional baseball player and coach
 Chet Trail, former professional baseball player
 Jon Berti, professional baseball player currently with the Miami Marlins

Football
 Martin Bayless, former professional football player
 Khary Campbell, former professional football player
 Jeff Groth, former professional football player
 Jeff Genyk, current tight ends coach and special teams coordinator for the University of Wisconsin football team 
 Vince Villanucci, former professional football player
 Phil Villapiano, former professional football player; four-time Pro Bowler
 Mike Weger, former professional football player
 Charlie Williams, former professional football player
 Doug Smith, former professional football player
 Fred Sturt, former professional football player
 Shaun Suisham, professional football player currently with the Pittsburgh Steelers
 Scott Mruczkowski, professional football player
 Don Nehlen, former player who became a highly successful coach at West Virginia University and college football hall of fame member
 Doyt Perry, former college football coach and college football hall of fame member
 Dave Preston, former professional football player
 Bob Schnelker, former professional football player
 Bob Reynolds, former professional football player
 Jamie Rivers, former professional football player
 Kory Lichtensteiger, professional football player currently with the Washington Redskins
 Chris Jones, professional football player with the New England Patriots
 Josh Harris, professional football player, last with the New York Giants
 Omar Jacobs, professional football player currently with the Jacksonville Sharks of the Arena Football League
 Dean Pees, NFL Defensive Coordinator
 Bob Seaman, football coach
 Bob Wolfe, football coach
 Joe Green, former professional player for the New York Giants
 Robert Redd, professional football player
 Kevin O'Brien, former professional football player
 Kamar Jorden, professional football player currently with the Calgary Stampeders of the Canadian Football League
 Scotty Miller, professional football player, Super Bowl LV champion

Hockey
 Kevin Bieksa, professional ice hockey player currently with the Anaheim Ducks
 Aris Brimanis, professional ice hockey player currently with the Hannover Scorpions
 Dan Bylsma, former professional ice hockey player and current head coach of the Buffalo Sabres
 Gino Cavallini, former professional hockey player, scorer for the Falcons NCAA National Championship, winning overtime goal
 Greg de Vries, former professional ice hockey player, won Stanley Cup in 2001
 Dave Ellett, former professional ice hockey player
 Nelson Emerson, former professional ice hockey player
 Alex Foster, professional ice hockey player
 Mark Friedman (born 1995), NHL player
 Garry Galley, former professional ice hockey player
 Dan Kane, former professional ice hockey player
 Ken Klee, former professional ice hockey player
 Wayne Wilson, current Head Coach of the RIT Tigers men's hockey team 
 Paul Ysebaert, former professional ice hockey player
 Mike Liut, former professional ice hockey player
 Brian MacLellan, professional ice hockey player, won Stanley Cup in 1989; current General Manager of the Washington Capitals
 Jon Matsumoto, professional hockey player currently with the San Jose Sharks
 Dan Sexton, professional ice hockey player currently with the Tampa Bay Lightning
 Jordan Sigalet, former professional ice hockey player; currently the goaltending coach for the Calgary Flames of the National Hockey League
 Jonathan Sigalet, professional ice hockey player playing for Brynäs IF in the Swedish Hockey League
 George McPhee, former professional ice hockey player, Hobey Baker Award winner, General Manager of NHL's Vegas Golden Knights and former GM of Washington Capitals
 Todd Reirden, former professional ice hockey player and current head coach for the Washington Capitals; won Stanley Cup in 2018
 Brian Holzinger, former professional ice hockey player and Hobey Baker Award winner
 Mike Johnson, former professional ice hockey player, currently an analyst for the NHL Network, and TSN and color commentator for the Winnipeg Jets
 Andrew Hammond, professional ice hockey player
 Brian Hills, former professional ice hockey player, current Associate Head Coach of the RIT Tigers men's hockey team

Other
 Alissa Czisny, figure skater and 2009 US Figure Skating National Champion 
 Mike McCullough, professional golfer
 Nick Mileti, former owner of Cleveland Cavaliers, Cleveland Indians, Cleveland Crusaders, and writer of Closet Italians
 Kurt Weaver, Rugby match official

Politics

Royalty
 Benson Akinruntan, son of Fredrick Obateru Akinruntan, a Nigerian Monarch

Ambassadors
 Daniel Ayalon, former Israeli ambassador to the U.S.
 Leonardo Neher, US Ambassador to Upper Volta

Judicial
 James Henry Gorbey, United States federal judge
 John R. Adams, federal judge on the United States District Court for the Northern District of Ohio
 Brenda Hollis, Chief persecutor in the Special Court for Sierra Leone
 Sara Elizabeth Lioi, United States District Judge
 James H. Wakatsuki, Justice of the Supreme Court of Hawaii

Activists
 Baldemar Velasquez, labor activist, received an honorary Doctor of Humane Letters
 Sam Pollock, labor activist, did not graduate
 Dominick Evans, activist, transferred to Wright State
 Hiroko Nakamoto, Hiroshima survivor, Interior Designer, Author and Peace Activist.

Politicians
 Pierre-Célestin Rwigema, 7th Prime Minister of Rwanda
 Edmond Spaho, Democratic Party of Albania MP
 Elizabeth M. Boyer, lawyer, writer, publisher, and feminist founder of WEAL
 Dan Greenberg, former politician, Heritage Foundation analyst, and writer for Cato Institute. Leader of the Advance Arkansas Institute
 Nick Licata, Seattle politician and activist
 Robin Weirauch, politician

United States Congress 
 Tom Luken, former Mayor of Cincinnati, Ohio and U.S. Congressional Representative (D-OH)
 Gene Krebs, former Ohio State Representative (R-OH, 1993–2000)
 Bob Latta, U.S. Congressional Representative (R-OH)
 Tim Ryan, U.S. Congressional Representative (D-OH)
 Robert P. Hanrahan, former U.S. Congressional Representative (R-IL)

City government 
 Hou Chong-wen, Deputy Mayor of Chiayi City, Taiwan
 Kathy Sheehan, Mayor of Albany, New York (D)
 Don Plusquellic, 59th mayor of Akron, Ohio
 Paul Muenzer, former Mayor of Naples, Florida (1992–1996)
 Janeé Ayers, labor organizer, member of the Detroit city council.
 Sandi Jackson, Chicago Alderman

State of Ohio government 
 Betty Montgomery, former Ohio Attorney General and State Auditor (R)
 Scott Nein, former Republican member of the Ohio General Assembly.
 Bruce Johnson, 63rd Lieutenant governor of Ohio.

Ohio House of Representatives 
Tim Brown, former Republican member of the Ohio House of Representative
 Chris Redfern, former Ohio state Representative and former chairman of the Ohio Democratic Party (D)
 Charles Kurfess, former member of the Ohio House of Representatives and judge.
 Douglas Swearingen, Jr., Republican member of the Ohio House of Representatives and former baseball player.
 Derek Merrin, Republican member of the Ohio House of Representatives.
 Rex Damschroder, former Republican member of the Ohio House of Representatives.
 Bruce Goodwin, former Republican member of the Ohio House of Representatives.
 Terry Boose, former Republican Member of the Ohio House of Representatives.
 Robin Belcher, former Democrat member of the Ohio House of Representatives
 Charlie Earl, former Ohio state representative, Libertarian candidate in the 2014 Ohio gubernatorial election

Ohio Senate 
 Randy Gardner, Ohio state senator (R) and Chancellor of the Ohio Department of Higher Education
 Theresa Gavarone, Republican member of the Ohio Senate.
 M. Ben Gaeth, former member of the Ohio Senate.
 Steve Buehrer, former member of the Ohio Senate and former director of the Ohio Bureau of Workers' Compensation
 Kevin Coughlin, former Republican member of the Ohio Senate.

Other state governments 
 Arnold E. Brown, first African American elected to represent Bergen County in the New Jersey Legislature.
 John Villapiano, former Democrat member of the New Jersey General Assembly and former professional football player
 Sue Rocca, former republican member of the Michigan House of Representatives.
 Tal Hutchins, Democrat member of the West Virginia House of Delegates
 Tim Berry, Indiana State Auditor (R)
 Dan Carter, State Representative, Connecticut 2nd Assembly District

News
 Beth Macy, journalist and non-fiction writer. Author of Truevine
 Karen T. Borchers, former photojournalist for The Mercury News. Shared a Pulitzer Prize for covering the 1989 Loma Prieta earthquake
 Ken W. Clawson, journalist and spokesman for President Richard Nixon
 Jason Schmitt, journalist, director of Paywall: The Business of Scholarship
 David Dietz, science journalist, 1937 Pulitzer Prize winner, honorary degree

Broadcast journalism
 Leon Bibb, WEWS news anchor
 Wilma Smith, former television anchor. Lower Great Lakes Emmy Awards winner.
 Herb Clarke, Weatherman
 Steve Hartman, CBS News correspondent
 Allison Payne, journalist and anchorwoman

Sports journalism
 Jim Day, sportscaster
 Steve Mason, sports journalist with ESPN
 Grant Napear, sports journalist and former lacrosse player
 Jason Jackson, ESPN sportscaster
 Steve Mears, NHL Network sportscaster
 Jay Crawford, ESPN sportscaster
 Mike Emrick, NHL on NBC play-by-play announcer

Science

Geology
 Barbara Bedette, Paleontologist, cataloged 30,860 Cenozoic molluscs
 Conrad Allen, geologist and inventor

Mathematics and statistics
 Andrew Ogg, Mathematician, creator of Ogg's formula, and involved in the creation of the Grothendieck–Ogg–Shafarevich formula, and the Néron–Ogg–Shafarevich criterion.
 Jie Chen, statistician with interdisciplinary biology research

Sociology
 Howard E. Aldrich, Sociologist and business theorist
 William Julius Wilson, University professor at Harvard, sociologist, and author. 80th president of the American Sociological Association. Advisor to Sudhir Venkatesh
 Anthony Walsh, criminologist and author

Psychology
 Russell Barkley, clinical psychologist
 Ralph Blair, Psychotherapist and LGBT advocate
 Charlie Reeve, Professor of psychology

Biology
 John E. Dohms, biologist specializing in avian disease Pathology. Was a member of the BGSU Lacrosse team.
 William Eugene Evans, Marine biologist and 5th National Oceanic and Atmospheric Administration president
 Sally Rockey, Entomologist and former deputy director of the National Institutes of Health
 Seymour Van Gundy, Nematologist
 Dan O'Brien, Wildlife biologist and author

Technology
 James G. Nell, electrical engineer involved in the development of GERAM.
 George Sweigert, first inventor to patent the cordless telephone, radio engineer.
 Jeremy Zawodny, computer technologist, MySQL promoter, Linux Magazine columnist.

Chemistry
 John Michael Ramsey, analytical chemist specializing in Microfluidics and Nanofluidics.
 Gary Keck, organic chemist specialized in synthesis of natural products. Developer of Keck asymmetric allylation.

Communications
 Bradley S. Greenberg, communications theorist
 Arthur P. Bochner, communications scholar
 Joan Kaderavek, speech language pathologist
 Suresh Canagarajah, Sri Lankan linguist specializing in Translanguaging and Linguistic imperialism

Economics
 William Easterly, development economist, author of The Elusive Quest for Growth and The Tyranny of Experts.
 Paul Chongkun Hong, professor of Operations Management

Political science
 David J. Jackson, political scientist
 W. Wesley McDonald, political scientist, author of Russell Kirk and the Age of Ideology

Business and philanthropy
 Shantanu Narayen, CEO of Adobe Systems
 Carole Kariuki, CEO of the Kenyan Private Sector Alliance 
 Otara Gunewardene, Sri Lankan and founder of Odel
 Michael C. Heim, CIO of Eli Lilly and Company
 Judith Craven, leadership roles in Luby's and Sysco
 Deborah Thigpen, Entrepreneur and publicist.
 Jeffrey Boutelle, CEO of Pharmavite

Historians
 Robert Hugh Ferrell, historian focusing on World War I and American foreign policy.
 Stanley Kutler, historian who sued for the release of tapes relating to Watergate
 Robert L. Paquette, historian, cofounder of the Alexander Hamilton Institute for the Study of Western Civilization
 William J. Reese, Education historian
 H. Micheal Tarver, Latin American historian; Commissioner on the Arkansas History Commission and the Arkansas Historical Records Advisory Board
 Mary Beckinsale, Art historian, President Emeritus of Studio Arts College International, honorary degree

Military
 John N. Abrams, four star general and commander of the United States Army Training and Doctrine Command
 Niles Fulwyler, former US Army Major general and former commanding general of the White Sands Missile Range

Academic administrators
 Victor Boschini, Chancellor of Texas Christian University
 Adena Williams Loston, President of St. Philip's College, San Antonio, Texas. Former Chief Education Officer at NASA.
 Dean L. Bresciani, President of North Dakota State University
 Rosa Roberto Carter, former president of the University of Guam
 Erma Johnson Hadley, first African American chancellor of Tarrant County College
 Sarah Harder, feminist and former president of the American Association of University Women
 Charles "Chuck" Johnson, President of Vincennes University
 William N. Johnston, 16th president of Wesley College (Delaware)
 Jack Ohle, President of Gustavus Adolphus College
 Everett Piper, former president of Oklahoma Wesleyan University and political columnist.

Other
 Becky Minger, Miss Ohio America 2010
 Peter Manto, bishop of the Reformed Episcopal Church's Diocese of the Central States
 Robert Balling, climate change denier

References

 
Bowling Green State University